Alert: Missing Persons Unit is an American police procedural crime drama television series created by John Eisendrath and Jamie Foxx. It premiered on Fox on January 8, 2023.

Premise
Jason Grant (Caan) and Nikki Batista (Ramirez) investigate cases for the Philadelphia Police Department's Missing Person's Unit (MPU) while also trying to find out the truth about their missing son.

Cast and characters

Main
 Scott Caan as Jason Grant, Nikki's ex-husband, who works in the missing unit department with her to help people find their missing loved ones.
 Dania Ramirez as Nikki Batista
 Ryan Broussard as Mike Sherman
 Adeola Role as Kemi Adebayo
 Graham Verchere as Lucas Hadley

Recurring
 Petey Gibson as C Hemingway, the supervisor of the Missing Persons Unit's forensic imaging unit
 Fivel Stewart as Sidney Grant, Jason and Nikki's daughter
 Elana Dunkelman as Rachel, medical examiner

Guest
 Bre Blair as June Butler, Jason's girlfriend and business partner

Episodes

Production

Development
In March 2022, it was announced John Eisendrath and Sony Pictures Television had Alert in development at Fox with a script, format and back-up script commitment plus penalty. In May of that year, it was announced Fox had given a straight-to-series order to Alert with Eisendrath to serve as showrunner and executive producer alongside Jamie Foxx and Datari Turner.

Casting
In August 2022, it was announced Dania Ramirez had been cast as one of the leads with Scott Caan cast as the second lead shortly thereafter. In October 2022, Adeola Role, Ryan Broussard, and Graham Verchere were announced as series regulars. In November 2022, Petey Gibson, Fivel Stewart, and Bre Blair joined the cast in recurring roles.

Reception

Critical response
The review aggregator website Rotten Tomatoes reported a 33% approval rating with an average rating of 7/10, based on 6 critic reviews. Metacritic, which uses a weighted average, assigned a score of 49 out of 100 based on 5 critics, indicating "mixed or average reviews".

Ratings

References

External links
 
 

2020s American crime drama television series
2020s American police procedural television series
2023 American television series debuts
English-language television shows
Fictional portrayals of the Philadelphia Police Department
Fox Broadcasting Company original programming
Television series about missing people
Television series by Fox Entertainment
Television series by Sony Pictures Television
Television series created by John Eisendrath
Television series created by Jamie Foxx
Television shows set in Philadelphia